Bakhtiyarpur Junction, station code BKP, is a railway station in the Danapur railway division of East Central Railway. Bakhtiyarpur is connected to metropolitan areas of India, by the Delhi–Kolkata main line via Pt. Deen Dayal Upadhyaya Junction-Patna route. Bakhtiyarpur Junction is located in Bakhtiarpur city in Patna district in the Indian state of Bihar. Due to its location on the Howrah–Patna–Pt. Deen Dayal Upadhyaya Junction main line many trains from Patna and Barauni bound express trains coming from Howrah, Sealdah stop here.

Facilities 
The major facilities available are waiting rooms, computerized reservation facility, Vehicle parking. The vehicles are allowed to enter the station premises. The station also has STD/ISD/PCO Telephone booth, toilets, tea stall and book stall. The station has been recently equipped with Railways WiFi facility.

Platforms 

There are 5 platforms in this station. The  platforms  are interconnected with foot overbridges (FOB).
Bakhityarpur junction contains 5 platform in which platform 1 and 2 are main line platform 1 patna to asansol and platform 2 goes patna junction
Platform 3 4 5 basically use for rajgir, bihar sahrif, murhari hi - tech city, harnaut.

Nearest airports 
The nearest airport to Bakhtiyarpur Junction are:
Gaya Airport 
Lok Nayak Jayaprakash Airport, Patna

References

External links 
 Bakhtiyarpur Junction Map
 Official website of the Patna district

Railway stations in Patna district
Railway junction stations in Bihar
Danapur railway division